Orancistrocerus is a small genus of potter wasps which has species recorded from the Far East and northern South America and southern Central America.

References

Biological pest control wasps
Potter wasps